Military surplus are goods, usually matériel, that are sold or otherwise disposed of when held in excess or are no longer needed by the military. Entrepreneurs often buy these goods and resell them at surplus stores. Usually the goods sold by the military are clothing, equipment, and tools of a nature that is generally useful to the civilian population, as well as embroidered patches, name tags, and other items that can be used for a faux military uniform. Occasionally, vehicles (jeeps, trucks, etc.) will be sold as well. Some military surplus dealers also sell military surplus firearms, spare parts, and ammunition alongside surplus uniforms and equipment.

Demand for such items comes from various collectors, outdoorsmen, adventurers, hunters, survivalists, and players of airsoft and paintball, as well as others seeking high quality, sturdy, military issue garb. The goods may be used, or not. Some merchants of surplus goods also sell goods that are privately manufactured in military standards.

Most items that are sold in military surplus stores in the United States are deemed "military grade". This designation refers to meeting a relevant United States Military Standard. For example, uniforms meet Army Regulation 670-1.

History 

The history of army surplus in the United States dates back to the American Civil War. This was the first large American war that required proper military uniforms for many troops. In earlier wars, most troops were basically a militia wearing whatever they had with them. This required mass-produced wears and arms for both sides. After the war, to recoup some money, they sold the supplies in stores. Thus the military surplus store was born.

In the 1870s, Francis Bannerman VI operated "Bannerman's surplus". His surplus company was one of the largest ever to operate. He built Bannerman's Castle, a massive storage facility on Pollepel Island in the Hudson River, to store his goods.

See also 

 Surplus store
 Diminishing manufacturing sources and material shortages
 Performance-based logistics
 Spare part
 Military Surplus Act (Kahn–Wadsworth Act)
 Surplus Property Act
 Radical Dance Faction, band previously known as "Military Surplus"

References 

Surplus stores
Militaria
Retailing by products and services sold
Sales